Grevillea teretifolia, commonly known as` round leaf grevillea,<ref name=FB>{{FloraBase|name=Grevillea teretifolia|id=2104}}</ref> is species of flowering plant in the family Proteaceae and is endemic to the southwest of Western Australia. It is an erect to spreading shrub with many stems, divided leaves, the end lobes sharply pointed and more or less cylindrical, and clusters of white or pale pink flowers.

TaxonomyGrevillea teretifolia was first formally described by the botanist Carl Meissner in 1848 in Lehmann's Plantae Preissianae, the type specimen collected by James Drummond in the Swan River Colony. The specific epithet (teretifolia) means "terete-leaved".

Distribution and habitat
Round leaf grevillea grows in a range of habitats from dense heath to open shrubland and is widespread in the area between Mullewa, Albany, Peak Charles and Coolgardie in the Avon Wheatbelt, Coolgardie, Esperance Plains, Geraldton Sandplains, Jarrah Forest, Mallee and Yalgoo bioregions of south-western Western Australia.

Conservation statusGrevillea teretifolia'' is listed as "not threatened" by the Government of Western Australia Department of Biodiversity, Conservation and Attractions.

Use in horticulture
This grevillea can be grown as hedge or screening plant and attracts birds such as honeyeaters. It is suitable for gardens in colder climates and is regraded as being both drought and frost tolerant.

See also
 List of Grevillea species

References

teretifolia
Endemic flora of Western Australia
Eudicots of Western Australia
Proteales of Australia
Taxa named by Carl Meissner
Plants described in 1848